The Barakah nuclear power plant, code BNEP (from "Barakah Nuclear Energy Plant"), is the United Arab Emirates' first nuclear power station, the first nuclear power station in the Arabian Peninsula, the second in the Persian Gulf region and the first commercial nuclear power station in the Arab World. It consists of four APR-1400 nuclear reactors (three operating, one undergoing post-construction testing). Total nameplate capacity is 5380 MW which is intended to supply up to 25% of UAE's electricity needs. The site is in the Gharbiya region of Abu Dhabi, on the coastline between the Persian Gulf and the E11 highway, 50 km west of Ruwais.

History

Contracting 
In December 2009, Emirates Nuclear Energy Corporation (ENEC) awarded a coalition led by Korea Electric Power Corporation (KEPCO) a $20 billion bid to build the first nuclear power plant in the UAE. Barakah was chosen as the site to build four APR-1400 nuclear reactors successively, with the first scheduled to start supplying electricity in 2017.

In 2011, Bloomberg reported that following detailed finance agreements, the build cost was put at $30 billion and financed with $10 billion equity, $10 billion export-credit agency debt, and $10 billion from bank and sovereign debt. South Korea may earn a further $20 billion from operation, maintenance and fuel supply contracts.  A later Bloomberg report indicates the price as $25 billion.

As of 22 March 2018, the project's total cost was refined to $24.4 billion to complete. Startup of Unit 1 was delayed to late 2018.

Timeline 

The plant's ground-breaking ceremony was held on 14 March 2011, including Korean President Lee Myung-bak. It has four units.
Construction of the first unit was begun in the afternoon of 18 July 2012, ahead of its scheduled date in late 2012. This happened despite delays being mooted in the wake of the Fukushima Daiichi nuclear disaster. 
In May 2013, construction started on the second unit, which was  then expected to take five years. The first safety-related concrete was poured for Unit 3 in September 2014. Unit 4  started construction in September 2015.

In 2014, the Barakah 1 reactor vessel was delivered onsite and site preparation works for Barakah 3 and 4 started. Meanwhile, the concrete-and-steel reactor containment building for Barakah 1 was completed in January 2015.

In March 2015, ENEC applied to Federal Authority for Nuclear Regulation (FANR) for operating licences for Units 1 and 2. 

In September 2015, first concrete was poured for Unit 4. More than 18,000 staff were then working on the construction of all 4 units.

In December 2017, the rebel Houthis group claimed to have fired a cruise missile in the direction of the Barakah plant, but the Emirati authorities said that no missiles had actually reached the UAE.

In December 2018, it was reported that voids were found in the concrete containment buildings for units 2 & 3. Grease was found to have leaked through the unit 3 containment, which may have been due to a crack in the concrete.

Unit 1 was declared complete in 2018. However it was not expected to begin operations until late 2019 or early 2020. In January 2020 it was announced that fuel loading would commence that quarter, about 2.5 years later than the original planned date of August 2017. FANR had raised 400 adverse findings in a review requiring rectification of various technical, organisational and management issues.

In March 2020, ENEC announced the completion of the fuel assemblies loading into the Unit 1 reactor. The reactor started generating electricity in August 2020 and entered commercial operation in 2021.

Completion

Unit 1 is 100% complete as of December 2018. It entered commercial service in April 2021.
Unit 2 is 100% complete as of April 2021. It entered commercial service in March 2022.
Unit 3 is 100% complete as of November 2021. It entered commercial service in February 2023.
Unit 4 is 100% complete as of July 2022.

Overall construction completion rate for the entire plant is at 96%, as of November 2021.

Criticism 
In March 2019, Qatar lodged a letter of complaint to the International Atomic Energy Agency (IAEA) regarding the Barakah nuclear power plant, stating concerns about its safety and lack of co-operation with regional states on the project as well as that it poses a serious threat to regional stability and the environment. The UAE denied that there are safety issues with the plant stating that Barakah adheres to the highest standards of nuclear safety and security.

See also

 Nuclear power in the United Arab Emirates
 List of nuclear reactors#United Arab Emirates
 Energy in the United Arab Emirates

References

External links

 Construction photo album

Nuclear power stations in the United Arab Emirates
Nuclear power stations with reactors under construction
Nuclear power stations using pressurized water reactors
Buildings and structures in the United Arab Emirates